"Don't Forget to Remember Me" is a song written by Morgane Hayes (now known as Morgane Stapleton), Kelley Lovelace and Ashley Gorley, and recorded by American country music artist Carrie Underwood.  It was released in March 2006 as the fourth single from Underwood's debut album, Some Hearts.  It is also her second release to country radio.  The song peaked at number two on the Billboard country charts in early 2006, and number 49 on the Billboard Hot 100. It has sold 403,000 copies.

Content
Underwood tells a story of good-bye when she is ready to leave home after graduating high school. When she is ready to leave the house to move on with her life, her mother tells her not to forget her. Underwood has to accept the fact that now she is living all by herself as she relates in her lyrics.

Music video
In the music video, which was premiered on CMT on March 12, 2006. Underwood is shown walking off a bus and immediately signing autographs, as the song moves on Underwood, in her new house, has flashbacks of when she is loading up her Chevy with equipment and hugging her mother as she sings in the song "We were loading up that Chevy both tryin' not to cry." Underwood also sings while approaching a public telephone to call her mother and at the end of the music video she takes the stage and sings to an empty large auditorium.

Underwood's mother appears in the video as herself.

Chart performance
The song debuted at number 54 on the Billboard Hot Country Songs chart. It entered the U.S. Billboard Hot 100 at number 98 after two weeks of being in the Top 30 on the country charts. It reached number two on Hot Country Songs and spent one week at that position.

Year-end charts

Commercial performance
As of August 13, 2013, the single has sold 403,000 copies and was certified gold by the RIAA.

Awards

2007 ASCAP Country Music Awards

|-
| align="center"|2007 ||align="center"| "Don't Forget to Remember Me" ||align="center"| Most Performed Song of the Year ||

Certifications

References

2006 singles
2005 songs
Carrie Underwood songs
Country ballads
Pop ballads
Music videos directed by Roman White
Songs written by Ashley Gorley
Arista Nashville singles
Song recordings produced by Mark Bright (record producer)
Songs written by Kelley Lovelace